Freeman's, formerly known as Samuel T. Freeman & Co., is an auction house in Philadelphia, Pennsylvania, United States. It was founded in 1805 by Tristram B. Freeman, a print seller who came to America from London.

History

After an order from Pennsylvania Governor Thomas McKean, Freeman was appointed to the office of auctioneer in Philadelphia, where he subsequently began the company.  Over the years Freeman's has grown both nationally, opening regional offices throughout the US, and internationally, expanding into the European market after forming an alliance with Lyon & Turnbull in 2000.

Located at 2400 Market Street, Freeman's offers over 25 in-house auctions a year in sale categories including: American Furniture, Folk & Decorative Arts, English & Continental Furniture & Decorative Arts, Asian Arts, American Art & Pennsylvania Impressionists, European Art & Old Masters, Modern and Contemporary Art, Books, Maps & Manuscripts, 20th Century Design, Jewelry & Watches, and Silver & Objets de Vertu.

In 2016, the company's controlling interest was transferred to the current management team of Hanna Dougher, Chief Operating Officer; Alasdair Nichol, then-Vice Chairman; and Paul Roberts, President, in a friendly management buy-out.

The current Chairman of Freeman's is Alasdair Nichol, who assumed the role after Samuel M “Beau” Freeman II, the sixth generation of the Freeman family to run the auction house, died in June 2017.

Notable auction records

On September 10, 2011, Freeman's held an auction that brought $3.5 million for a Jade seal, triple the highest sale in the company's history. Other notable auction records set at Freeman's include a sculpture by Wharton Esherick as part of their annual Pennsylvania Sale in November 2014. In November 2017, a draped canvas painting by Sam Gilliam sold for $370,000. Both lots set auction records for the respective artist. 

Freeman's set a company record in November 2017 when a rare, Belle Époque fancy vivid yellow diamond pendant by J.E. Caldwell and Co. sold for $760,000, making it the most expensive piece of jewelry the house had ever sold.

In the European Art and Old Masters Auction in February 2021, Carl Moll's "Weißes Interieur (White Interior)" sold for $4,756,000. This rediscovered masterpiece was Freeman’s highest selling lot to date, surpassing the house’s 2011 record of $3.1m achieved by an important Imperial white jade seal from the Qianlong period.

Collections

Freeman's has been entrusted with the sale of some of the world's most fascinating collections of fine art and antiques, including the Richard M. Scrushy Collection, The Lehman Brothers Collection, Property from the Reed & Barton Archives, The Avon Collection of Photography and The Collection of Historic USS Constitution Colors of H. Richard Dietrich, Jr. The March 2014 sale of The George D. Horst Collection of Fine Art resulted in 20 auction records for artists including Howard Russell Butler, Emil Carlsen, and Fred Wagner. The December 2016 sale of The Brewster Collection offered paintings, furniture, and decorative items from Nancy and Andre Brewster, who were both respected activists and philanthropists.

In April 2016, Freeman's hosted 1,000 Years of Collecting, which offered property from the private Washington, D.C. collection of Jeffrey M. Kaplan. The 465-lot sale was offered in two sessions, with 99% sold by dollar and 96% by lot, totaling over $1.2 million in sales. In May 2017, Freeman's sold paintings and prints from The Stanley Bard Collection , the late manager of the famed Chelsea Hotel. The auction included a painting by Tom Wesselmann, “Face #1,” which sold for $958,000 .

References

External links
 Freeman's official website

American auction houses
American companies established in 1805
Retail companies established in 1805
Companies based in Philadelphia
1805 establishments in Pennsylvania